The Kestler Building was one of many historic buildings in the Columbia-Tusculum neighborhood of Cincinnati, Ohio, United States.  Originally a store, it was a weatherboarded building set on a stone foundation.  Parts of the building were once used for residential purposes, in addition to the commercial space.  Along with many other buildings in the neighborhood, it was listed on the National Register of Historic Places on August 24, 1979, qualifying because of its historically significant architecture; like several other Eastern Avenue commercial buildings, it was deemed historic partially because of its exterior design work.

References

Buildings and structures completed in 1906
National Register of Historic Places in Cincinnati
Buildings and structures in Cincinnati
1906 establishments in Ohio